2nd meridian may refer to:

2nd meridian east, a line of longitude east of the Greenwich Meridian
2nd meridian west, a line of longitude west of the Greenwich Meridian
The Second Principal Meridian in Illinois and Indiana, United States, 86°28' west of Greenwich
The Second Meridian of the Dominion Land Survey in Canada, 102° west of Greenwich
Meridian 2, a Russian communications satellite